John Nicholls  (–1832) was an English lawyer and politician.

Nuchollas was the son of Frank Nicholls, who was a physician to King George II. His mother Elizabeth was a daughter of the physician  Richard Mead.

He was educated at Exeter College, Oxford and at Lincoln's Inn, where he was called to the bar in 1767.

He married a granddaughter of Edmund Gibson, the Bishop of London from 1723 to 1748.

He was a Member of Parliament (MP) for Bletchingley from 1783 to 1787, and for Tregony from 1796 to 1802.

References 
 

Year of birth uncertain
1745 births
1832 deaths
Members of the Parliament of Great Britain for English constituencies
British MPs 1780–1784
British MPs 1784–1790
Members of the Parliament of Great Britain for Tregony
British MPs 1796–1800
Members of the Parliament of the United Kingdom for Tregony
UK MPs 1801–1802
Members of Lincoln's Inn
Alumni of Exeter College, Oxford